The Brute is a 1961 Hungarian film directed by Zoltán Fábri. It was entered into the 1961 Cannes Film Festival.

Cast
 Ferenc Bessenyei - Ulveczki Sándor
 Tibor Bitskey - Gál Jani
 Mária Medgyesi - Monoki Zsuzsi
 Béla Barsi - Bíró
 György Györffy - Balogh
 Pál Nádai - Földházi
 Sándor Siménfalvy - Monoki, Zsuzsi apja
 Antal Farkas - Szûcs

References

External links

1961 films
1960s Hungarian-language films
Hungarian black-and-white films
Films directed by Zoltán Fábri